{{DISPLAYTITLE:Lambda2 Tucanae}}

Lambda2 Tucanae is a solitary star in the southern constellation of Tucana. It is faintly visible to the naked eye with an apparent visual magnitude of +5.45. At that distance, the visual magnitude of the star is diminished by an extinction factor of 0.09 due to interstellar dust.

This is an orange-hued K-type giant star on the red giant branch, with a stellar classification of K2 III. It has an estimated 1.75 times the mass of the Sun but after evolving away from the main sequence it has expanded to 9.8 times the Sun's radius. The star is radiating 39 times the solar luminosity from its photosphere at an effective temperature of 4,605 K.

References

K-type giants
Tucanae, Lambda
Tucana (constellation)
Durchmusterung objects
005457
004293
0270